Adam Joseph Pineault (born May 23, 1986) is an American former professional ice hockey forward who played three games for the Columbus Blue Jackets in the National Hockey League (NHL).

Playing career
As a youth, Pineault played in the 1999 and 2000 Quebec International Pee-Wee Hockey Tournaments with the Boston Junior Eagles, and then the Minuteman Flames minor ice hockey teams.

Pineault was drafted 46th overall in the 2004 NHL Entry Draft by the Columbus Blue Jackets. Pineault originally was a product of the U.S National Development Program. He then played collegiate hockey in 2003–04 with Boston College before moving on to the Moncton Wildcats of the QMJHL.

Pineault made his professional debut in the 2006–07 season with the Blue Jackets affiliate, Syracuse Crunch. Pineault made his NHL debut in the 2007–08 season on April 3, 2008, against the Detroit Red Wings.

On January 10, 2009, Pineault was traded by the Blue Jackets to the Chicago Blackhawks for Michael Blunden. He was then assigned to the Rockford IceHogs of the American Hockey League for the remainder of the 2008–09 season.

Pineault left for Europe and signed during the 2009–10 season to trial with HC in the Czech Extraliga on  November 2, 2009. After appearing in ten games with Pardubice, Pineault established himself offensively and was offered a contract to remain on the team on December 8, 2009. Adding a physical presence and scoring 10 goals and 20 points in 31 games as a role player, Pineault was given an extended multi-year contract to stay in the Czech Republic on May 14, 2010.

After resuming his career in North America, with a tenure in the Central Hockey League with the Allen Americans, Pineault signed a one-year contract as a free agent with the Utah Grizzlies of the ECHL on August 28, 2013. At the completion of the 2013–14 season with the Grizzlies, after suffering from a Jaw injury for a significant portion of the year, Pineault opted to end his eight-year professional career and retire.

Personal
Pineault took 2011 away from hockey to be with his wife, Monique Pineault who was battling Leukemia at the time. After his wife went into remission he continued playing hockey for the Allen Americans, but only played in 3 games before returning to be with his wife. Upon retirement, Pinealt opted for a career in pharmaceutical sales, driven by his wife Monique's battle with acute myeloid leukemia.

Career statistics

Regular season and playoffs

International

References

External links

1986 births
Allen Americans players
American men's ice hockey right wingers
Boston College Eagles men's ice hockey players
Columbus Blue Jackets draft picks
Columbus Blue Jackets players
HC Dynamo Pardubice players
Living people
Moncton Wildcats players
Sportspeople from Holyoke, Massachusetts
Rockford IceHogs (AHL) players
Syracuse Crunch players
Utah Grizzlies (ECHL) players
Ice hockey players from Massachusetts
American expatriate ice hockey players in Canada
American expatriate ice hockey players in the Czech Republic